Shepherd's pie, cottage pie, or in its French version hachis Parmentier is a savoury dish of cooked minced meat topped with mashed potato and baked. The meat used may be either previously cooked or freshly minced. The usual meats are beef or lamb. The two English terms have been used interchangeably since they came into use in the late 18th and the 19th century, although some writers insist that a shepherd's pie should contain lamb or mutton, and a cottage pie, beef.

History

Cottage pie

The term was in use by 1791. Parson Woodforde mentions "Cottage-Pye" in his diary entry for 29 August 1791, and several times thereafter. He records that the meat was veal but he does not say what the topping was. The dish was known in its present form, though not under the same name, in the early 19th century: in 1806 Maria Rundell published a recipe for "Sanders", consisting of the same ingredients as cottage or shepherd's pie: minced beef or mutton, with onion and gravy, topped with mashed potato and baked. 

In 20th-century and later use the term cottage pie has widely, but not exclusively, been used for a dish of chopped or minced beef with a mashed potato topping. The beef may be fresh or previously cooked; the latter was at one time more usual. Well into the 20th century the absence of refrigeration made it expedient in many domestic kitchens to store cooked meat rather than raw. In the 1940s the chef Louis Diat recalled of his childhood days, "when housewives bought their Sunday meat they selected pieces large enough to make into leftover dishes for several days". Modern recipes for cottage pie typically use fresh beef.

Shepherd's pie
A recipe for shepherd's pie published in Edinburgh in 1849 in The Practice of Cookery and Pastry specifies cooked meat of any kind, sliced rather than minced, covered with mashed potato and baked. In the 1850s the term was also used for a Scottish dish that contained a mutton and diced potato filling inside a pastry crust. Neither shepherd's pie nor cottage pie was mentioned in the original edition of Mrs Beeton's Household Management in 1861.

More recently "shepherd's pie" has generally been used for a potato-topped dish of minced lamb. According to the Oxford Companion to Food, "In keeping with the name, the meat should be mutton or lamb; and it is usually cooked meat left over from a roast". As with beef, it was commonplace in the days before refrigeration to cook a Sunday joint to last in various guises throughout the week. Dorothy Hartley quotes an old verse, "Vicarage mutton", showing not only the uses to which the joint was put, but also the interchangeability of the terms "shepherd's" and "cottage" pie:
          Hot on Sunday,
          Cold on Monday,
          Hashed on Tuesday,
          Minced on Wednesday,
          Curried Thursday,
          Broth on Friday,
          Cottage pie Saturday.

Hachis Parmentier
The dish is named after Antoine-Augustin Parmentier, who popularised the potato in French cuisine in the late 18th century.  It is documented from the late 19th century. It is usually made with chopped or minced lamb or beef; in either case it may be made with either fresh or left-over cooked meat. (The modern English term "hash" derives from the French "hachis", meaning food "finely chopped".)

In some recipes a layer of sauté potatoes is put in the cooking dish before the meat filling and mashed potato topping are added. A more elaborate version by Auguste Escoffier, named Hachis de boeuf à Parmentier, consists of baked potatoes, the contents of which are removed, mixed with freshly-cooked diced beef, returned to the potato shells. and covered with sauce lyonnaise.

Variations

There are no universally agreed ingredients for any of the three dishes. The 24 recipes cited in the table show the varieties of titles and ingredients recommended by cooks and food writers from Australia, Britain, Canada, France and the US.

Similar dishes
Fillings for other pies with a mashed potato topping are numerous, and include artichoke hearts and red peppers; black pudding; chicken and spinach; chorizo; curried chicken; duck; rabbit; salmon; salt cod; turkey and ham; and flaked white fish with shrimps, in a white sauce.

Other pies with non-pastry toppings include:

See also

 Antoine-Augustin Parmentier
 British cuisine
 English cuisine
 French cuisine
 Irish cuisine
 List of English dishes
 List of French dishes
 List of Irish dishes
 List of pies, tarts and flans
 List of potato dishes
 Moussaka
 Pâté aux pommes de terre
 Pâté chinois
 Welsh cuisine

Notes, references and sources

Notes

References

Sources

 

 

     

                  

 

  

British pies
Australian pies
New Zealand pies
Potato dishes
Savoury pies
Meat and potatoes dishes
Ground meat
Irish meat dishes
British meat dishes
French meat dishes